Papa Juan Pablo II is the Spanish name for Pope John Paul II.

Juan Pablo II may also refer to:

 Juan Pablo II Bridge, a bridge over the Biobio River in Chile
 Liceo Juan Pablo II, a high school in Nancagua, Colchagua, Chile
 Colegio Juan Pablo II, a school in Villavicencio, Meta, Colombia
 Juan Pablo II (2005 song) by El Tri off the album Más Allá del Bien y el Mal

See also

Juan Pablo

John Paul II (disambiguation)
Juan II (disambiguation)
Pablo (disambiguation)